University of Cross River State  also known as UNICROSS is a state-owned tertiary institution with four campuses spread across four Local Government Areas of the state. The University was formerly known as the Cross River University of Technology (CRUTECH). It was renamed in February of 2021 by a bill passed at Cross River State House of Assembly which was then approved by the Governor of the State, Benedict Ayade. The change of the tertiary institution's name was to enable the varsity function as a conventional University, which provides the opportunity to offer more professional courses rather focusing on tech-related courses.

The University took back the indigenous name of the state which was held by the University of Cross River State, Uyo now the University of Uyo, Akwa Ibom State, Nigeria till 1st October 1991 when the Federal government of Nigeria established the University of Uyo as a Federal University after the separation of the Akwa Ibom Region from Cross River State in 1987. The University of Uyo inherited students, staff, academic programmes and the entire facilities of the then University of Cross River State established by Cross River State in 1983. 

The Office of the Vice-Chancellor, Deputy Vice-Chancellor and the Bursar are all located in the Calabar Campus, considered the main campus of the Institution, which is located in Calabar South Local Government Area of Cross River State in Southern Nigeria. The University was established in 2002 by the then Governor Donald Duke by merging three higher institutions: The Polytechnic of Calabar, The College of Education, and Ibrahim Babangida College of Agriculture. It offers degree courses at undergraduate and post graduate levels.
The university currently has campuses in Calabar, Obubra, Ogoja and Okuku.

See also
 List of universities in Nigeria

References

Universities and colleges in Nigeria
2002 establishments in Nigeria
Educational institutions established in 2002
Education in Cross River State